This is a list of members of the Aztec Club of 1847. The Aztec Club of 1847 was founded as a military society of officers who served with the United States Army in the Mexican–American War.

The first rank indicated is the rank held at the forming of the club during the Mexican War; the later rank is the highest full rank the officer held in Regular, Volunteer or Confederate service.

Original members
There were a total of 160 original members of the Aztec Club, all of whom were serving in the occupation of Mexico City at the time of the Club's founding in 1847.  Over time, the club's membership requirements were changed to extend membership to male descendants of officers who served in the Mexican War. Of the 160 original members, 72 became generals in either the United States Army or the Confederate States Army and a majority served in either the Union or Confederate armies during the American Civil War.

Among the Aztec Club's original members were future presidents Franklin Pierce and Ulysses S. Grant as well as Robert E. Lee.

 Maj. John J. Abercrombie – Brigadier General
 Cpt. Thomas L. Alexander – Lt. Colonel
 Cpt. Robert Allen – Brigadier General
 1st Lt. Samuel S. Anderson – Colonel, CSA
 1st Lt. Benjamin H. Arthur – Captain
 Cpt. Electus Backus – Colonel
 Maj. Henry Bainbridge – Lt. Colonel
 Cpt. John G. Barnard – Brigadier General
 Cpt. Moses J. Barnard – Major
 1st Lt. Jenks Beaman
 1st Lt. P.G.T. Beauregard – General, CSA
 2nd Lt. Barnard E. Bee – Brigadier General, CSA
 Lt. Col. Francis S. Belton – Colonel
 Cpt. Charles John Biddle – Colonel
 1st Lt. William B. Blair – Major, CSA
 Cpt. George A.H. Blake – Colonel
 Cpt. James D. Blanding – Colonel, CSA
 Cpt. William Blanding
 Col. Milledge L. Bonham – Brigadier General, CSA
 1st Lt. Andrew W. Bowman – Lt. Colonel
 1st Lt. John M. Brannan – Brigadier General
 Cpt. Horace Brooks – Brigadier General
 1st Lt. William T.H. Brooks – Major General
 Cpt. Robert C. Buchanan – Colonel
 Brig. Gen. George Cadwalader – Major General
 Cpt. Albemarle Cady – Colonel
 Maj. George Caldwell - Brevet Lieutenant Colonel
 1st Lt. Robert C. Caldwell, USMC
 1st Lt. George W. Carr – Colonel, CSA
 1st Lt. Daniel T. Chandler – Lt. Colonel, CSA
 Maj. Philip St. George Cooke – Brigadier General
 1st Lt. William H. French – Major General
 Cpt. Richard C. Gatlin – Brigadier General, CSA
 2nd Lt. Alfred Gibbs – Brigadier General
 1st Lt. Ulysses S. Grant – General
 2nd Lt. Schuyler Hamilton – Brigadier General
 Col. William S. Harney – Brigadier General
 Cpt. Joseph Hooker – Major General
 Cpt. Joseph E. Johnston – General, CSA
 Cpt. Philip Kearny – Major General
 Maj. Edmund Kirby - Brevet Colonel
 Cpt. Robert E. Lee – General, CSA
 Cpt. John B. Magruder – Major General, CSA
 2nd Lt. George B. McClellan – Major General
 Cpt. Justus McKinstry – Brigadier General
 Maj. John Munroe – Lt. Colonel
 1st Lt. John C. Pemberton – Lieutenant General, CSA
 Brig. Gen. Franklin Pierce - President of the United States
 Maj. William H. Polk – U.S. Representative and brother of President James K. Polk
 1st Lt. Fitz John Porter – Major General
 Maj. Gen. John A. Quitman
 2nd Lt. Jesse L. Reno – Major General
 Cpt. Charles F. Smith – Major General
 Col. Persifor F. Smith – Brigadier General
 2nd Lt. Gustavus W. Smith – Major General, CSA
 2nd Lt. Charles Pomeroy Stone – Brigadier General
 1st Lt. George Sykes – Major General
 2nd Lt. Zealous B. Tower – Brigadier General
 Brig. Gen. David E. Twiggs – Major General, CSA
 Col. William J. Worth – Brevet Major General
 Maj. Abraham Van Buren – Brevet Lieutenant Colonel and son of President Martin Van Buren

Veteran members
In 1871 Club members agreed to accept other officers who had served in Mexico during the Mexican War as Veteran Members; including officers of the United States Navy. Veteran Members were veterans of the Mexican War but were not among the 160 original members who formed the society in 1847. As of 1895, 127 individuals had been admitted as Veteran Members – 49 of which were generals or admirals in United States or Confederate States service.

 Cpt. Benjamin Alvord - Brigadier General
 1st Lt. Christopher C. Augur – Major General
 Midn. Oscar C. Badger – Commodore, USN
 2nd Lt. Simon B. Buckner – Lieutenant General, CSA
 2nd Lt. John L. Broome – Lt. Colonel, USMC
 2nd Lt. Henry B. Clitz – Lt. Colonel
 Cpt. Silas Casey – Major General
 2nd Lt. Darius N. Couch – Major General
 Lt. Col. Thomas L. Crittenden – Major General
 2nd Lt. Frederick T. Dent – Brigadier General
 2nd Lt. Richard C. Drum – Brigadier General
 1st Lt. William H. Emory – Major General
 2nd Lt. William B. Franklin – Major General
 1st Lt. Samuel G. French – Major General, CSA
 2nd Lt. James Barnet Fry – Brigadier General
 2nd Lt. George W. Getty – Brigadier General
 Midn. Bancroft Gherardi – Rear Admiral, USN
 2nd Lt. Winfield Scott Hancock – Major General
 2nd Lt. Henry Heth – Major General, CSA
 1st Lt. Henry J. Hunt – Brigadier General
 Lt. Thornton A. Jenkins – Rear Admiral
 Maj. William W. Loring – Major General, CSA
 1st Lt. James Longstreet – Lieutenant General, CSA
 Midn. Stephen Luce - Rear Admiral, USN
 2nd Lt. Charles G. McCawley – Colonel, USMC
 2nd Lt. Joseph H. Potter – Brigadier General
 Cpt. Henry Prince – Brigadier General
 Midn. Alexander C. Rhind – Rear Admiral
 2nd Lt. Gustavus De Russy – Brigadier General
 1st Lt. William T. Sherman – General
 2nd Lt. Egbert L. Viele – Brigadier General
 2nd Lt. Thomas J. Wood – Major General

Honorary members
Only two individuals were chosen as an honorary members of the Aztec Club.
 Chaplain John D. McCarty
 Maj. Gen. Winfield Scott – Bvt. Lieutenant General

Hereditary members
In 1883 provisions were also made to allow male relatives of officers who had died during the Mexican War, prior to the Club's founding, to become members. In 1887, membership was extended to the eldest son or nearest male relative of original and veteran members as hereditary members in order to keep the club alive after the deaths of the veterans. Later, this rule was extended to include direct and collateral male descendants of eligible officers.
 Brig. Gen. Joshua H. Bates
 Henry L. P. Beckwith
 Maj. Charles J. Biddle
 R. Adm. Norman J. Blackwood
 Justice Milledge Lipscomb Bonham
 Lt. Gen. James Carson Breckinridge (USMC)
 R. Adm. Silas Casey, III
 2nd Lt. Loyall Farragut - Son of Admiral David Farragut
 Alfred W. Gibbs
 Maj. Gen. Frederick D. Grant - son of General Ulysses S. Grant
 Maj. Gen. Ulysses S. Grant, III - grandson of General Ulysses S. Grant
 Maj. Gen. Guy V. Henry
 Mayor George B. McClellan, Jr. - Son of Major General George B. McClellan
 Maj. Gen. David D. Porter (USMC)
 John Stone Stone
 R. Adm. Montgomery M. Taylor
 R. Adm. Aaron Ward
 Maj. Gen. William W. Wotherspoon

Trivia
As the Mexican War was fought only 14 years prior to the American Civil War, many senior officers in both the Union and Confederate armies had been members of the Aztec Club. Of 287 members who joined the society by 1895, 121 were generals in the Union or Confederate armies.

Two presidents of the United States were members of the Aztec Club – Franklin Pierce and Ulysses S. Grant.

Another president who was a veteran of the Mexican War was President and Major General Zachary Taylor, who, although having served with great distinction during the war and despite some sources to the contrary, was not a member of the Aztec Club. He does not appear on the roll of the 160 original members of the society in The Constitution of the Aztec Club of 1847 and the List of Members, 1893. This is because the Club was formed by officers serving in Mexico City in 1847 and Taylor served in northeastern Mexico. The Aztec Club did not expand its membership beyond the original 160 members until 1871 – 21 years after Taylor's death.

John C. Breckinridge, who was Vice President of the United States from 1857 to 1861 and a candidate for president in 1860, who served with the Army of Occupation of Mexico City as the major of the 3rd Kentucky Infantry, did not join the Aztec Club before his death in 1875. He served as a Major General in the Confederate States Army during the American Civil War.

References

 
 
American people of the Mexican–American War
American military personnel of the Mexican–American War
Lineage societies
Mexican–American War